The Johns Hopkins University School of Medicine (JHUSOM) is the medical school of Johns Hopkins University, a private research university in Baltimore, Maryland. Founded in 1893, the School of Medicine shares a campus with the Johns Hopkins Hospital and Johns Hopkins Children's Center, established in 1889. It has consistently ranked among the top medical schools in the United States in terms of the number/amount of research grants/funding awarded by the National Institutes of Health, among other measures.

History
The founding physicians (the "Four Doctors") of the Johns Hopkins School of Medicine included pathologist William Henry Welch (1850–1934), the first dean of the school and a mentor to generations of research scientists; a Canadian, internist Sir William Osler (1849–1919), regarded as the Father of Modern Medicine, having been perhaps the most influential physician of the late 19th and early 20th centuries as author of The Principles and Practice of Medicine (1892), written at the Johns Hopkins Hospital and published for more than a century; surgeon William Stewart Halsted (1852–1922), who revolutionized surgery by insisting on subtle skill and technique, as well as strict adherence to sanitary procedures; and gynecologist Howard Atwood Kelly (1858–1943), a superb gynecological surgeon credited with establishing gynecology as a specialty and being among the first to use radium to treat cancer.

The Johns Hopkins School of Medicine, which was finally begun 17 years after its original visionary benefactor Johns Hopkins (1795–1873), died and opened only with the large financial help offered by several wealthy daughters of the city's business elite on condition that the medical school be open equally to students of both sexes, consequently one of the first co-educational medical colleges.

Campus
The School of Medicine shares a campus with the Johns Hopkins Hospital and Johns Hopkins Children's Center, its main teaching hospitals, as well as several other regional medical centers, including Johns Hopkins Bayview Medical Center on Eastern Avenue in East Baltimore; the Howard County General Hospital, near Ellicott City, southwest of Baltimore; Suburban Hospital in Bethesda, (northwest of Washington, D.C.);  Sibley Memorial Hospital in Washington, D.C.; and Johns Hopkins All Children's Hospital in St. Petersburg, Florida. Together, they form an academic health science centre.

The Johns Hopkins School of Medicine is the home of many medical advancements and contributions, including the first of many to admit women and to introduce rubber gloves, which provided a sterile approach to conducting surgical procedures. Johns Hopkins has also published The Harriet Lane Handbook, an indispensable tool for pediatricians, for over 60 years. The Lieber Institute for Brain Development is an affiliate of the School.

Reputation
According to the Flexner Report, Hopkins has served as the model for American medical education. Its major teaching hospital, the Johns Hopkins Hospital, was ranked the top hospital in the United States every year from 1991 to 2011 by U.S. News & World Report. In 2022, U.S. News & World Report ranked Hopkins #3 in Research and #52 in Primary Care, while Specialty Rankings were #2 in Anesthesiology, #1 in Internal Medicine, #6 in Obstetrics and Gynecology, #4 in Pediatrics, #3 in Psychiatry, #1 in Radiology, and #1 in Surgery .

Colleges

Upon matriculation, medical students at the Johns Hopkins School of Medicine are divided into four colleges named after famous Hopkins faculty members who have had an impact in the history of medicine (Florence Sabin, Vivien Thomas, Daniel Nathans, and Helen Taussig). The colleges were established to "foster camaraderie, networking, advising, mentoring, professionalism, clinical skills, and scholarship" in 2005. In each incoming class, 30 students are assigned to each college, and each college is further subdivided into six molecules of five students each. Each molecule is advised and taught by a faculty advisor, who instructs them in Clinical Foundations of Medicine, a core first-year course, and continues advising them throughout their 4 years of medical school. The family within each college of each molecule across the four years who belong to a given advisor is referred to as a macromolecule. Every year, the colleges compete in the "College Olympics" in late October, a competition that includes athletic events and sports, as well as art battles and dance-offs.

Thomas College was named for Vivien Thomas, the surgical technician who was the driving force behind the successful creation of the Blalock-Taussig Shunt procedure (now renamed Blalock-Taussig-Thomas shunt). Thomas did not receive rightful credit for decades due to racial discrimination (Thomas was African-American). His story was detailed in the 2004 HBO documentary Something the Lord Made

Governance

The Johns Hopkins School of Medicine is led by Ronald J. Daniels, the president of the Johns Hopkins University, Paul B. Rothman, CEO and dean of the medical faculty, and Redonda Miller, president of the Johns Hopkins Hospital and health system. The CFO of Johns Hopkins Medicine is Richard A. Grossi, who is also the Senior Associate Dean for Finance and Administration and executive vice president of Johns Hopkins Medicine.

Nobel laureates
18 Nobel laureates associated with the School of Medicine as alumni and faculty have won the Nobel Prize in Medicine or  Chemistry. Johns Hopkins University as a whole counts 38 Nobel laureates.

Gregg L. Semenza – Faculty, pediatrician, Nobel Prize in Physiology or Medicine, 2019
William Kaelin Jr. – former resident, Nobel Prize in Physiology or Medicine, 2019
Carol Greider – Faculty, Nobel Prize in Physiology or Medicine, 2009
Richard Axel – MD 1971, Nobel Prize in Physiology or Medicine, 2004
Peter Agre – MD 1974, Nobel Prize in Chemistry, 2003
Paul Greengard – PhD 1953, Nobel Prize in Physiology or Medicine, 2000
Henry David Abraham – MD 1967, Nobel Peace Prize (co-recipient), 1985 
David H. Hubel – former resident, Nobel Prize in Physiology or Medicine, 1981
Torsten Wiesel –  Faculty, Nobel Prize in Physiology or Medicine, 1981
Hamilton O. Smith – Faculty, MD 1956, Nobel Prize in Physiology or Medicine, 1978
Daniel Nathans – Faculty, Nobel Prize in Physiology or Medicine, 1978
Haldan Keffer Hartline – MD 1927, Nobel Prize in Physiology or Medicine, 1967
Francis Peyton Rous – MD, Nobel Prize in Physiology or Medicine, 1966
Joseph Erlanger – MD 1899, Nobel Prize in Physiology or Medicine, 1944
Herbert Spencer Gasser – MD 1915, Nobel Prize in Physiology or Medicine, 1944
George Minot –  Assistant in Medicine, Nobel Prize in Physiology or Medicine, 1934
George Whipple – MD 1905, Nobel Prize in Physiology or Medicine, 1934
Thomas Hunt Morgan – PhD 1890, Nobel Prize in Physiology or Medicine, 1933

Notable faculty and alumni
		

 John Jacob Abel – Pharmacologist, founder and chair of the first department of pharmacology in the U.S.
 Fuller Albright – endocrinologist, trained at Johns Hopkins; Albright's hereditary osteodystrophy; McCune–Albright syndrome
 Dorothy Hansine Andersen – identified cystic fibrosis and Andersen's disease
 John Auer – physiologist and pharmacologist, namesake of the Auer rod in acute myeloid leukemia
 Stanhope Bayne-Jones – Bacteriologist and U.S. Army Brigadier General
 Jeremy M. Berg – former Director of Biophysics and Biophysical Chemistry; co-author of the Biochemistry textbook
 George Packer Berry – Dean of Harvard Medical School
 John Shaw Billings – Civil War surgeon, pioneering leader in hygiene	
 Alfred Blalock – Developed field of cardiac surgery; Blalock–Taussig shunt
 Mary Blue –  neurobiologist and computational neurologist
 Eugene Braunwald – acclaimed cardiologist, trained at Hopkins; editor of Braunwald's Heart Disease, now in its 11th edition; longtime editor of Harrison's Principles of Internal Medicine
 Max Brödel – Medical illustrator; illustrated for Harvey Cushing, William Halsted and Howard Kelly
 William R. Brody – Radiologist, President of the Salk Institute, former President of Johns Hopkins University
 Ernesto Bustamante – Biochemist & Molecular Biologist, ex Chief of the National Institute of Health of Peru, Elected Member of Parliament of Peru 2021-2026	
 Karen Carroll (pathologist)   –  infectious disease pathologist and medical microbiologist, professor of pathology and Director of the Division of Medical Microbiology	
 Ben Carson – retired pediatric neurosurgeon, U. S. Secretary of Housing and Urban Development, awarded Presidential Medal of Freedom
 Caroline August Chandler – Associate Professor of Pediatrics
 Patricia Charache – Microbiologist and infectious disease specialist
 Denton Cooley – cardiovascular surgeon
 John Fielding Crigler – pediatrician; first described Crigler–Najjar syndrome
 Thomas Stephen Cullen	– helped establish the first gynecologic pathology laboratory, and advanced understanding of endometriosis, among other gynecologic conditions
 Harvey Cushing – Father of modern neurosurgery; Cushing's syndrome; Cushing ulcer	
 Walter Dandy – Neurosurgeon, namesake of the Dandy-Walker malformation
 Daniel C. Darrow – pediatrician and clinical biochemist
 George Delahunty – physiologist and endocrinologist; Lilian Welsh Professor of Biology at Goucher College
 Harry Dietz – pediatric geneticist; described Loeys–Dietz syndrome
 Catherine Clarke Fenselau – Biochemist and mass spectrometrist
 Joseph F. Fraumeni, Jr. – described Li–Fraumeni syndrome; trained at Johns Hopkins
 Irwin Freedberg – former Director of Dermatology
 Ernest William Goodpasture – pathologist, described Goodpasture syndrome
 Alan I. Green – psychiatrist, professor at Geisel School of Medicine
 Anita Gupta - Distinguished Fellow of the National Academies of Practice
 William Halsted – Father of modern surgery; one of the four founders of Johns Hopkins Medicine
 J. William Harbour M.D. – Ocular oncologist, cancer researcher and vice chairman at the Bascom Palmer Eye Institute in Miami
 Andy Harris – U.S. Congressman, 1st District of Maryland
 Tinsley R. Harrison – Cardiologist, editor of the first five editions of Harrison's Principles of Internal Medicine 
 Arthur Douglass Hirschfelder - apprentice of William Osler; Johns Hopkins' first full-time cardiologist
 Leroy Hood – Invented automated DNA and protein sequencing, Lasker Award winner, entrepreneur
 Howard A. Howe – Polio researcher
 Ralph H. Hruban – expert on pancreatic cancer; authored more than 700 peer-reviewed manuscripts and five books; recognized by Essential Science Indicators as the most highly cited pancreatic cancer scientist
 Kay Redfield Jamison – Psychologist and psychiatry professor, author of An Unquiet Mind
 James Jude – Father of CPR; thoracic surgeon who developed cardiopulmonary resuscitation
 William Kaelin Jr. – Nobel laureate, trained in internal medicine at Johns Hopkins
 Leo Kanner – Father of child psychiatry; first described autism in Autistic Disturbances of Affective Contact (1943)
 Chester Keefer – "Penicillin czar" during World War II, managed distribution and allocation of the then-new drug for civilian uses in the US; dean of the Boston University School of Medicine. 
 Howard Kelly – gynecologist; credited with establishing gynecology as a specialty
 Harry Klinefelter	 – rheumatologist, endocrinologist, namesake of Klinefelter syndrome
 Ricardo J Komotar – neurosurgeon; the director of the University of Miami Brain Tumor Initiative, the UM Neurosurgery Residency Program, and the UM Surgical Neurooncology Fellowship Program
 William B. Kouwenhoven – electrical engineer; developed the external defibrillator and helped develop cardiopulmonary resuscitation
 Albert L. Lehninger – former chairman of Biological Chemistry; author of widely used Principles of Biochemistry textbook
 Bruce Lerman – cardiologist; Chief of the Division of Cardiology and Director of the Cardiac Electrophysiology Laboratory at Weill Cornell Medicine and the New York Presbyterian Hospital
 Michael Lesch – described Lesch–Nyhan syndrome
 Bart Loeys – pediatric geneticist; described Loeys–Dietz syndrome
 Howard Markel – pediatrician, historian of medicine, medical journalist; Guggenheim Fellow, member of the National Academy of Medicine
 Donovan James McCune – described McCune–Albright syndrome
 Paul McHugh – former psychiatrist-in-chief at Johns Hopkins
 Victor A. McKusick – Developed the field of medical genetics; namesake of McKusick-Nathans Institute of Genetic Medicine; founder of OMIM
 John Menkes – identified Menkes disease
 Adolf Meyer – first psychiatrist-in-chief at Johns Hopkins
 Vernon Mountcastle – Neuroscientist, Lasker Award winner
 Victor Assad Najjar – pediatrician; first described Crigler–Najjar syndrome
 William Nyhan – pediatrician, described Lesch–Nyhan syndrome	
 William Osler – Father of modern medicine; Osler–Weber–Rendu syndrome (hereditary hemorrhagic telangiectasia)
 Wilder Penfield – Pioneer of epilepsy neurosurgery; developed the cortical homunculus	
 Peter Pronovost – Former anesthesiology faculty; Time 100 (2008); authored over 800 articles/chapters on patient safety; advisor to the World Health Organization's World Alliance for Patient Safety
 Alfredo Quiñones-Hinojosa – Neurosurgeon; former faculty in neurosurgery
 Mark M. Ravitch – Surgeon; pioneered modern surgical staples
 Dorothy Reed – Pathologist, namesake of the Reed–Sternberg cell in Hodgkin's lymphoma
 Dale G. Renlund – Cardiologist, trained at Johns Hopkins
 Mark C. Rogers – First director of the Pediatric Intensive Care Unit (PICU) at Johns Hopkins Hospital in 1977; authored Rogers’ Textbook of Pediatric Intensive Care
 David Sabatini – Howard Hughes Investigator and molecular biologist, discovered mTOR (mammalian target of rapamycin)
 Florence Sabin – Anatomist, namesake of Sabin College at Johns Hopkins School of Medicine
 Ernest Sachs – Neurosurgeon; graduated 1904
 Mark Schlissel – President Emeritus of the University of Michigan
 Pamela Sklar – Neuroscientist and psychiatrist
 Solomon H. Snyder – Neuroscientist, Lasker Award winner
 Gertrude Stein – novelist, poet and playwright
 Charlotte Sumner – neurologist
 Helen B. Taussig – Founder of pediatric cardiology, developed Blalock–Taussig shunt; namesake of Taussig College at Johns Hopkins School of Medicine
 Vivien Thomas – Developed the Blalock–Taussig shunt, namesake of Thomas College at Johns Hopkins School of Medicine
 Thomas Turner – Microbiologist, former Dean of Johns Hopkins School of Medicine (1957–68), archivist
 Victor Velculescu – Cancer genomics pioneer; entrepreneur
 Bert Vogelstein – Oncologist, trained in pediatrics; pioneer in cancer genetics, elucidated the role of p53 in cancer
 Rochelle Walensky – Director, Centers for Disease Control and Prevention
 Myron L. Weisfeldt   (M.D., 1965) – cardiologist, former William Osler Professor of Medicine and chairman of the Department of Medicine, Johns Hopkins School of Medicine
 David B. Weishampel –  Paleontologist, author of The Dinosauria
 William H. Welch – Pathologist, Dean of American Medicine, first Dean of Johns Hopkins School of Medicine
 Bang Wong – Creative director of the Broad Institute at MIT and Harvard University
 Hugh Hampton Young – Urologist, former head of Urology
 Elias Zerhouni – Radiologist, former Director of the NIH (2002–2008)
 Sheila West, ophthalmologist at the Wilmer Eye Institute

In popular culture
The ABC documentary series Hopkins takes a look at the life of the medical staff and students of the Johns Hopkins Hospital and Health System.  This new series is a sequel to the 2000 ABC special Hopkins 24/7. Both Hopkins and Hopkins 24/7 were awarded the Peabody Award.
The movie Something the Lord Made is the story of two men – an ambitious white surgeon, head of surgery at the Johns Hopkins Hospital and a gifted black carpenter turned lab technician – who defied the racial strictures of the Jim Crow South and together pioneered the field of heart surgery.

References

External links
 
 

Medical schools in Maryland
Middle East, Baltimore
Johns Hopkins Medical Institutions
Medicine
Academic health science centres
Educational institutions established in 1893
1893 establishments in Maryland